Hamilton streets have been formed since the 1864 Invasion of the Waikato, after which the first crown grants were given to members of the occupying force, the 4th Waikato Militia, and plans made of the initial street layout. The tables below show the 1,782 streets listed by Hamilton City Council as at 3 August 2020. They also include information from Hamilton City Libraries Heritage street name index cards. As the dates of naming and the old maps (see External links below) show, the city has grown a lot since it was  village in 1864. The shortest roads are small cul-de-sacs, the longest road reaching the centre of the city is River Road, which stretches  to Ngāruawāhia. The list is not comprehensive, omitting streets such as Percival Road. The  suburbs are as shown on the 2020  list, though there is some inconsistency, such as May and the adjoining June streets being shown in different suburbs.

Bader

Beerescourt

Chartwell

Chedworth

Claudelands

Deanwell

Dinsdale

Enderley

Fairfield

Fairview Downs

Fitzroy

Flagstaff

Forest Lake

Frankton

Glenview

Grandview Heights

Hamilton Central

Hamilton East

Hamilton Lake

Harrowfield

Hillcrest

Huntington

Maeroa

Melville

Nawton

Pukete

Queenwood

Riverlea

Rotokauri

Rototuna

Ruakura

Saint Andrews

Silverdale

Te Rapa

Temple View

Western Heights

Whitiora

References

External links 
Maps -

 1864 Hamilton West East
1879 Claudelands
 1895 Hamilton West
 1924 Hamilton E
 1925 Jolly estate, Frankton
 1936 Hamilton map
 1953 Hamilton map
 1954 Hamilton growth map, showing extensions of the city 1912-1954
 1956 Frankton map
 1966 Te Rapa map
 Hamilton street maps 1968, 1974, 1981

Hamilton
Geography of Hamilton, New Zealand